The Democratic Republic of the Congo records in swimming are the fastest ever performances of swimmers from the Democratic Republic of the Congo, which are recognised and ratified by the Fédération de Natation en République Démocratique du Congo.

All records were set in finals unless noted otherwise.

Long Course (50 m)

Men

Women

Short Course (25 m)

Men

Women

References

Democratic Republic of the Congo
Records
Swimming
Swimming